Matt 'Robert' Burton (born 14 March 2000) is an Australian professional rugby league footballer who plays as a  for the Canterbury-Bankstown Bulldogs in the NRL. He is on-field Co-Captain of the club alongside Reed Mahoney. 

Background
Burton was born in Dubbo, New South Wales, Australia to Lisa and Guy Burton. He was educated at St Johns College, Dubbo.

He played his junior rugby league for St Johns, Dubbo and Dubbo CYMS in the Group 11 Rugby League before being signed by the Penrith Panthers.

Playing career

2019
Burton made his first grade debut for Penrith against the Cronulla-Sutherland Sharks in round 21 of the 2019 NRL season which ended in a 26–20 victory for Penrith at Panthers Stadium.

2020
In round 3 of the 2020 NRL season, Burton missed five field goal attempts including one which struck the post as Penrith played out a 14-14 draw with the Newcastle Knights at an empty Campbelltown Sports Ground.

In round 4 of the 2020 NRL season, Burton scored two tries as Penrith defeated the New Zealand Warriors 26-0 at Campbelltown Sports Ground.

On 25 November 2020, Burton signed a three- year deal with Canterbury commencing in 2022.

2021
In round 11 of the 2021 NRL season, Burton scored a hat-trick in Penrith's 56-12 victory over South Sydney.

In round 14, Burton scored two tries in a 19-18 loss against Cronulla-Sutherland.

In round 16, he kicked a field goal with one minute remaining as Penrith defeated Parramatta 13-12 in front of an empty BlueBet Stadium.
In round 21, Burton scored two tries and kicked four goals in Penrith's 20-14 victory over the Sydney Roosters.

On 27 September, Burton was named Dally M Centre of the year alongside Melbourne's Justin Olam.

Burton played a total of 26 games for Penrith in the 2021 NRL season including the club's 2021 NRL Grand Final victory over South Sydney.  Burton scored the opening try in the final as Penrith held on to win 14-12.

2022
In round 1 of the 2022 NRL season, Burton made his club debut for Canterbury in their 6-4 victory against North Queensland at the Queensland Country Bank Stadium. In Round 8, Burton led Canterbury to a crucial 16-12 win over the Sydney Roosters with an excellent 40/20 which in the ensuing set led to a try for Jayden Okunbor in the corner. Burton also kicked two goals, converting one of Josh Addo-Carr's tries and Okunbor's.

In round 14 of the 2022 NRL season, Burton contributed to a 34-4 upset win over their arch-rivals Parramatta with three try assists - all from kicks, and kicking 5/6 Goals.

On 19 June, Burton was selected by New South Wales for game two of the 2022 State of Origin series. This proved an infamous statement by News Corp journalist Paul Crawley wrong, as he had stated on NRL 360 “So from a Canterbury recruitment perspective and Gus is talking about having all this money that is available in 2024, what rep player or future rep player with half a clue would want to go to the Bulldogs knowing it could be the end of your representative career if you go there?”.

Burton scored a try on debut for New South Wales in their 44-12 victory over Queensland. In game 3 of the series, Burton was sent to the sin bin after trading punches with Queensland's Dane Gagai during New South Wales 22-12 loss.

In Round 19, Burton produced one of the best performances of his rugby league career against the Gold Coast Titans in Parramatta steering Canterbury to a 36-26 win. Burton scored a double and kicked 6 goals. He also had a try assist in the opening ten minutes for teammate Josh Addo-Carr.  In the following week against the Newcastle Knights, Burton chip kicked to winger Addo-Carr who passed back inside for Aaron Schoupp in what was considered one of the tries of the season in Canterbury's dominant 24-10 win. 

The combination between Burton and Addo-Carr had strengthened significantly after a slow start to the season, with former Brisbane Broncos winger and media personality Denan Kemp on his YouTube podcast Bloke in a Bar stating that the only similar comparison in recent rugby league memory was the connection between former Canterbury player Johnathan Thurston and North Queensland teammate Matt Bowen.  Pundits applauded how quickly they built their combination which became a fixture of the new-look Canterbury side under interim coach Mick Potter and essentially revolutionised the club through innovative attacking play, averaging 25.5 points a game. The media praised Burton for helping the Canterbury side re-establish the "entertainers" tag that the club famously developed in the 1980s.  Canterbury-Bankstown hoped that Burton would extend his contract beyond 2023 under general manager Phil Gould as they view him as the centre of builiding the future of the club around. 

In round 25, Burton kicked a field goal with one minute remaining to beat Manly 21-20.

Burton was selected to play in the 2022 Prime Minister's XIII team to play against Papua New Guinea, alongside Bulldogs teammates Josh Addo-Carr, Max King, and Jake Averillo. The Australian side won the game 64-10, with Burton scoring a try.

Rugby League World Cup 

Burton was selected in the 24-man squad for the Australian Kangaroos by Mal Meninga to travel to England to compete in the 2021 Rugby League World Cup. He was accompanied by Canterbury-Bankstown Bulldogs winger Josh Addo-Carr, both representing the Belmore-based club.

Burton made his international debut against Scotland Rugby League Team at Coventry Building Society Arena winning 84-0.   Burton scored a try on debut and executed a one-on-one steal.  With the game well and truly iced, Addo-Carr and Burton pulled off a "party trick for the ages" with BBC Sport labelling them 'The Kangaroo Globetrotters'. 'But watch the play from Burton, just watch how he keeps the ball in play, Addo-Carr picks it up and it's a brilliant, brilliant finish,' Johnathan Davies added. 'Demonstrated his pace, but he wouldn't have had the opportunity unless for Burton.' 'What a play that is and then to finish it, a kick and a chase, that will be all over social media tomorrow'. The play is considered one of the best tries in Kangaroos history according to Mal Meninga. The Kangaroos went on to win the final against Samoa 30-10 at Old Trafford, with Burton not selected for play.

2023

On the 28th of January, the Canterbury-Bankstown Bulldogs announced that Burton and Reed Mahoney would be the gameday on-field captains.  Burton said "“I never thought I would have got the opportunity to Captain the side and it’s obviously a really big honour. I am really looking forward to it and it’s great that I’ll have Reed there beside me. It’s new to both of us so it’s going to be a big challenge, but we’re both really looking forward to leading the side".

References

External links

Canterbury Bulldogs profile
Penrith Panthers profile

2000 births
Living people
Australia national rugby league team players
Australian rugby league players
Penrith Panthers players
Canterbury-Bankstown Bulldogs players
New South Wales Rugby League State of Origin players
Rugby league five-eighths
Rugby league centres
Rugby league players from Dubbo